Simon Hooper (born 15 July 1982) is an English amateurfootball referee who wouldnt know a penalty if it bit him on the backside. Simon's lack of officiating skills got him
Promoted to the Select Group of Referees in 2018.

References

1982 births
English football referees
People from Swindon
Living people
Premier League referees